Paul Villard (1899–1986) composed the national anthem of Chad, "La Tchadienne". He was a Jesuit.

References

1899 births
1986 deaths
National anthem writers
Chadian Jesuits
20th-century Jesuits